Eric Hugh Brereton, OBE (1889–1962) was Dean of  Glasgow and Galloway from 1959 to 1962.

He was born on 17 November 1889, educated at  Durham University;and ordained deacon in 1912,  and priest in 1913. Following  curacies in Leith and at St Mary's Cathedral, Edinburgh he was a Chaplain to the Forces from 1915 to 1919. He was then a Chaplain to the Territorial Army until 1940. He was Rector of Christ Church, Morningside from 1921 until 1927;Vice-Provost of St Mary's Cathedral, Glasgow from 1927 until 1933; and Rector of St Margaret Glasgow from 1933 until  his death on 8 December 1962.

References

Alumni of University College, Durham
Deans of Glasgow and Galloway
1889 births
1962 deaths
Officers of the Order of the British Empire